The seventh season of the American comedy television series Scrubs premiered on NBC on October 25, 2007 and concluded on May 8, 2008 and consists of 11 episodes. This was the final season to air on NBC after it was picked up by ABC.

Season 7 was confirmed to have a reduced number of 18 episodes and was likely to be the final season. Due to the 2007–2008 Writers Guild of America strike, only 11 episodes were finished and 6 aired before the strike. During the strike, it was unknown if production on the final episodes would resume or that a possible series finale would air due to the actors' contracts expiring if the strike were to last a long time. After the strike was over, the final five episodes aired starting April 10, 2008. Episode 12, titled "My Commitment" was partially completed before the strike, but was never completed or aired. Some material shot for "My Commitment" was later used in the season 8 episode, "My Nah Nah Nah".

Season 7 continues to focus on the fact that J.D. has to grow up. He also has to deal with his newborn son, Sam. Both Elliot and J.D. deal with the fact that they may be with the wrong person (Keith and Kim). Turk tries to grow closer with Carla. Dr. Cox gets a temporary promotion. Dr. Kelso has to deal with the fact that the hospital has a mandatory retirement policy. Also, the Janitor starts dating Lady, who works at the hospital.

Cast and characters

Main cast
Zach Braff as Dr. John "J.D." Dorian
Sarah Chalke as Dr. Elliot Reid
Donald Faison as Dr. Chris Turk
Neil Flynn as The Janitor
Ken Jenkins as Dr. Bob Kelso
John C. McGinley as Dr. Perry Cox
Judy Reyes as Nurse Carla Espinosa

Recurring roles
Sam Lloyd as Ted Buckland
Robert Maschio as Dr. Todd Quinlan
Christa Miller as Jordan Sullivan
Johnny Kastl as Dr. Doug Murphy
Travis Schuldt as Keith Dudemeister
Aloma Wright as Nurse Shirley

Guest stars
Elizabeth Banks as Dr. Kim Briggs
Kit Pongetti as Ladinia "Lady" Williams
Tom Cavanagh as Dan Dorian
Michael McDonald as Mr. Cropper
Mindy Sterling as Mrs. Cropper
The Blanks as the Worthless Peons

Production

Writing staff
Bill Lawrence – executive producer/head writer
Neil Goldman and Garrett Donovan – executive producers/assistant head writers
Bill Callahan – executive producer/assistant head writer (episodes 1–6)
Mike Schwartz – co-executive producer
Debra Fordham – co-executive producer
Mark Stegemann – co-executive producer
Janae Bakken – co-executive producer
Angela Nissel – supervising producer
Kevin Biegel – executive story editor
Aseem Batra – executive story editor
Clarence Livingston – executive story editor
Dave Tennant – story editor
Andy Schwartz – story editor

Production staff
Bill Lawrence – executive producer/showrunner
Randall Winston – producer
Liz Newman – producer
Danny Rose – co-producer
Abraham Park – associate producer

Directors
Includes directors who directed 2 or more episodes, or directors who are part of the cast and crew
Bill Lawrence (2 episodes)
Zach Braff (2 episodes)
Michael McDonald (1 episode)
Rick Blue (editor) (1 episode)

Episodes

References 

General references

External links 

 

 
2007 American television seasons
2008 American television seasons
7